EEU may refer to:
 Elior Evangelical University
 Empower European Universities, a Dutch think tank
 English Engineering Units
 Eurasian Economic Union
 European Esperanto Union